The 1916 United States Senate election in Vermont took place on November 7, 1916. Incumbent Republican Carroll S. Page successfully ran for re-election to another term in the United States Senate, defeating Democratic candidate Oscar C. Miller. This was the second United States Senate direct election to take place in Vermont following the ratification of the Seventeenth Amendment to the United States Constitution and the first for Vermont's Class I seat.

Republican primary

Results

Democratic primary

Results

General election

Results

References

1916
Vermont
1916 Vermont elections